Julia Sude (born 2 September 1987 in Gießen) is a German beach volleyball player.

Professional career
Since 2015 her teammate has been Chantal Laboureur.

World tour 2016

At the 2016 Grand Slam at Long Beach, California, 
In semi final action (Aug 27, 2016) Julia Sude and Laboureur lost to Kerri Walsh Jennings and April Ross of United States straight sets (21 - 17, 21 - 16).

Bronze medal match (Germany vs Germany) the pair won in straight sets (21-16, 21-17) against Katrin Holtwick and Ilka Semmler.

The pair competed at the Toronto World Tour finals in Sept. 2016  placing 1st in Pool D and advance to Quarter Finals.

References

External links

 
 
 
 

German women's beach volleyball players
1987 births
Living people
Universiade bronze medalists for Germany
Universiade medalists in beach volleyball
Medalists at the 2013 Summer Universiade
Olympic beach volleyball players of Germany
Beach volleyball players at the 2020 Summer Olympics